Sarsden is a village and civil parish about  south of Chipping Norton, Oxfordshire. The 2001 Census recorded the parish population as 83.  Since 2012 Sarsden has been part of the Churchill and Sarsden joint parish council area, sharing a parish council with the adjacent civil parish of Churchill.

Notable buildings
Sarsden House is a country house, rebuilt in 1689 after it was damaged by fire. In 1795 Humphry Repton landscaped the park, adding a serpentine lake and a Doric temple. In about 1825 Repton's son, the architect G.S. Repton, remodelled the house for James Langston. The house is a Grade II* listed building. The Church of England parish church of Saint James was rebuilt in 1760. GS Repton added a cruciform extension to the east in 1823. In 1896 the architect Walter Mills of Banbury remodelled the north transept and added the bellcote. G.S. Repton remodelled it as a large cottage orné in 1825.

References

Sources and further reading

External links
The Parish Council of Churchill and Sarsden

Civil parishes in Oxfordshire
Villages in Oxfordshire
West Oxfordshire District